Duberstein is a surname. Notable people with the surname include:

Conrad B. Duberstein ( 1915–2005), American judge
Kenneth Duberstein (1944–2022), American businessman and government official
Larry Duberstein (born 1944), American author